Serializable may refer to:

 Serializable (databases), an attribute of a transactions' schedule (history)
 Serialization, a term used primarily in Java and .NET as an attribute of an object class